Aricó or Arico is an Italian surname. Notable people with the surname include:

José Aricó, Argentine sociologist
Kim Barnes Arico, American basketball coach
Larry Arico, American football coach
Pedro Arico Suárez, Argentine footballer
Rodolfo Aricò, Italian painter

See also
 Arico, a municipality and village on Tenerife, Canary Islands, Spain

Italian-language surnames